The United Kingdom of Great Britain and Northern Ireland competed under the shortened name of Great Britain and Northern Ireland at the 2007 World Championships in Athletics.

Heading into the championships, UK Athletics set a target of three medals and fourteen top eight-placed athletes. Six medals were won and there were thirteen top eight finishes.

Results

Finals
List of Britain's results, where athletes reached the final in that event (performances in heats, quarter-finals and semi-finals are not included.)

Qualification rounds
('Q': Automatic Qualifier, 'q': Fastest Loser Qualifier, '-': Did not qualify, 'DQ' – Disqualified, 'n/a' Not applicable, 'NMR': No Mark Recorded)
SB: Season's Best, PB: Personal Best)

NOTE: Where an athlete reached a final, their result will be posted above ONLY and not below

100 m M

100 m W

200 m W

400 m M

400 m W

800 m M

800 m W

1,500 m M

1,500 m W

5000 m M

5000 m W

110 m Hurdles

400 mH M

400 mH W

3,000 m SC W

3,000 m SC M

High Jump M

Long Jump M

Triple Jump M

Pole Vault M

Pole Vault W

Javelin Throw W

4 × 100 m M

4 × 100 m W

4 × 400 m M

4 × 400 m W

Competitors

Actual List
This is the actual team of athletes that Great Britain sent to Osaka. Some of the athletes were added as reserves, or other reasons. See below for the original list.

Original List
The athletes below were the original list of competitors, however due to other circumstances, injury etc., some were replaced or more added.  The revised list is above this list.

Notes

Nations at the 2007 World Championships in Athletics
World Championships in Athletics
Athletics in the United Kingdom
Great Britain and Northern Ireland at the World Championships in Athletics
Athletics in Northern Ireland
2007 in Northern Ireland sport